The 2016 Buckle Up in Your Truck 255 was the 10th stock car race of the 2016 NASCAR Camping World Truck Series, and the 6th iteration of the event. The race was held on Thursday, July 7, 2016, in Sparta, Kentucky, at Kentucky Speedway, a 1.5-mile (2.4 km) permanent tri-oval shaped racetrack. The race took the scheduled 150 laps to complete. William Byron, driving for Kyle Busch Motorsports, held off John Hunter Nemechek and Daniel Hemric in the final 20 laps, and earned his fourth career NASCAR Camping World Truck Series win. This was also the 51st win for Kyle Busch Motorsports, making them the most winningest team in the Truck Series.

Background 

Kentucky Speedway is a  tri-oval speedway in Sparta, Kentucky, which has hosted ARCA, NASCAR and Indy Racing League racing annually since it opened in 2000. The track is currently owned and operated by Speedway Motorsports, Inc. Before 2008 Jerry Carroll, along with four other investors, were the majority owners of Kentucky Speedway. Depending on layout and configuration the track facility has a grandstand capacity of 107,000.

Entry list 

 (R) denotes rookie driver.
 (i) denotes driver who is ineligible for series driver points.

Notes

Practice

First practice 
The first practice session was originally going to be held on Wednesday, July 6, at 1:00 pm EST, and last for 1 hour and 55 minutes. The session was delayed for 2 hours due to inclement weather, and because of this, only two practice sessions would be held.

Final practice 
The final practice session was held on Wednesday, July 6, at 6:00 pm EST, and would last for about 3 hours.

Qualifying 
Qualifying was held on Thursday, July 7, at 5:00 pm EST. Since Kentucky Speedway is at least 1.5 miles (2.4 km) in length, the qualifying system was a single car, single lap, two round system where in the first round, everyone would set a time to determine positions 13–32. Then, the fastest 12 qualifiers would move on to the second round to determine positions 1–12.

Mike Harmon would fail to qualify.

Full qualifying results

Race results

Standings after the race 

Drivers' Championship standings

Note: Only the first 8 positions are included for the driver standings.

References 

NASCAR races at Kentucky Speedway
July 2016 sports events in the United States
2016 in sports in Kentucky